The 2021 FIFA Arab Cup Final was a football match which determined the winners of the 2021 FIFA Arab Cup. The match was held at Al Bayt Stadium in Al Khor, Qatar on 18 December 2021 and was contested by Tunisia and Algeria, the winners of the semi-finals.

Background 

Both Tunisia and Algeria marked their third appearance in the Arab Cup: Tunisia won the first edition in 1963, while Algeria had never won the competition. This is both countries' first-ever Arab Cup final, as the 1963 edition won by Tunisia was played in a group format. Prior to the final, Algeria led in head-to-head games, having won 16 times to Tunisia's 15; the two sides drew 13 times. Tunisia was undefeated to Algeria in competitive matches since 1987.

Route to the final

Match

Summary
The game went to extra-time and nine minutes into the first-half, Algeria's Amir Sayoud scored with a long range left footed shot into the left corner of the net.
As Tunisia desperately tried to level the match deep into added on time, the ball broke from a Tunisia corner and reached Yacine Brahimi who ran into the penalty area before shooting into the empty net from six yards out to put Algeria 2-0 up.

Details

Notes

References

External links 

F
Arab Cup finals
Tunisia national football team matches
Algeria national football team matches
Arab Cup
Arab Cup
December 2021 sports events in Asia